The 1842 Grand Liverpool Steeplechase was the fourth official annual running of a steeplechase, later to become known as the Grand National Steeplechase, a horse race which took place at Aintree Racecourse near Liverpool on 2 March 1842 and attracted 15 runners.

Although recorded by the press at the time as the seventh running of the Grand Liverpool, which was renamed the Grand National in 1847, the first three runnings were poorly organised affairs and are today regarded as unofficial.

The race was not run as a handicap chase and therefore all the runners were declared to carry 12 stone with the exception of the winner of the 1840 Cheltenham Steeplechase who had to carry 13 stone 4 lbs.

Competitors and Betting
5/1 Favourite was Lottery who again was burdened with the Cheltenham penalty of 13 stone 4 lbs. The 1839 winner was partnered for the fourth time in the race by Jem Mason, one of five riders having a fourth ride in the race.
6/1 Peter Simple, an eight-year-old grey entire who had been third last year. He was a debut ride for Robert Hunter, one of eight rookies in the race.
6/1 Seventy Four, the nine-year-old runner up of 1839, providing a fourth ride for last year's winning jockey A Powell.
7/1 Gaylad, an 8-year-old fourth ride for Tom Olliver who had finished second in 1839.
8/1 Sam Weller, an 8-year-old owned by Lottery's rider Jem Mason and providing P Barker with his fourth National ride.
10/1 Consul, a 10-year-old ridden by F Oldaker
10/1 Lucks All, a 10-year-old ridden by Thomas Goddard
100/7 Satirist, a 6-year-old, which, when unofficial Nationals are included, was giving 1840 winner, Bartholomew Bretherton his fourth ride.
15/1 The Returned, an 8-year-old ridden by William Hope-Johnstone
20/1 Banathlath, a 7-year-old ridden by Peter Colgan
20/1 Bangalore, a 10-year-old ridden by Captain William Peel

The remaining runners did not command a starting price from the bookmakers and were sent off unquoted.
 Anonymous, a 10-year-old ridden by his owner, G Moore
 Columbine, an 8-year-old who had fallen in 1840 and was ridden this year by Larry Byrne.
 Honesty, an 8-year-old ridden by William McDonough
 Lady Langford ridden by J Abbott

The race
The course consisted of two circuits of a spindle shaped course at Aintree, starting from a position beside the stables and running off the racecourse over Melling Road and into open countryside. The competitors would have to negotiate any hedges and banks they came across to travel from field to field, most of which were open ploughland, until reaching Becher's Brook, a man made post and rails. From here the field then turned left towards the Leeds to Liverpool canal, before jumping the Canal Turn, a fence at a sharp 90 degree angle. This would then place the runners in the fields running along the canal where they would jump Valentine's Brook, The Table top, a fence in which the landing side was significantly raised, and then the lane fences, two hedges either side of the Melling Road that marked the point where the runners re-entered the actual race course. From here the land was laid to turf as the runners turned left and came back towards the stands. Here they had to negotiate the monument or made fence, today known as the chair, and then a water jump before setting off on a second circuit of the course. On reaching the race course for a second time the runners would this time jump two hurdles before a long run in to the finish line, bypassing the monument fence and water jump on the way.

Anonymous and Columbine led the competitors around the first circuit in which Sam Weller was the only recorded faller, somewhere near Becher's Brook.

At the start of the second circuit Peter Simple took up the running and by the time Becher's Brook was reached for the second time the competitors were spread out over a furlong of the course.

Peter Simple still led at the Canal Turn but it was here that Lottery was pulled up after showing signs of distress. Only the Seventy Four, Gaylad, Columbine and The Returned were still within one field {fence} of the leader at this point but the grey was still full of running and looked very likely to win.

At the turn for home a group of spectators, keen to get a good view, had encroached onto the course without realising. Peter Simple was by now many lengths clear but his rider failed to notice the spectators in time and in trying to avoid them he was thrown from his mount. Powell, on second placed Seventy Four was able to take evasive action and continued towards the hurdles in the lead with only Gaylad close enough to challenge.

Seventy Four jumped the final hurdle in the lead but was very tired by this stage and failed to respond to the vigorous urgings of his rider for an extra effort. Gaylad by contrast was treated with much more compassion by his rider and responded to this nursing by finding the extra effort necessary to get up and win by four lengths. The very unfortunate Peter Simple was remounted to finish fifteen lengths back in third with The Returned and Columbine the only other recorded finishers. The remaining runners, with the exception of Sam Weller and Lottery are believed to have completed the course but were so far behind that they were probably swallowed up by the many mounted spectators and carriages who would follow the runners from the top end of the racecourse down the home straight.

The race was timed at 13 minutes and 30 seconds, a full minute outside the record.

Finishing order

Colours as published in The Liverpool Mail, Thursday March 3rd 1842
Distanced refers to horses that was not in site of the judge when the first horse reached the chair.

1-2-3-4

Winner: Gaylad was ridden by Tom Olliver, who was one of the most experienced riders in the race, having his fourth ride after finishing second in 1839 while riding Seventy Four. The horse was owned by Piccadilly horse trader John Elmore, already a winner with Lottery in 1839. It was also suggested that Elmore had owned a part share in 1840 Grand National winner, Jerry. He was trained by George Dockeray whose Epsom stables had also prepared Lottery and Jerry when they had won.

Second: Seventy Four, who was finishing second for the second time and carried the colours of Lord Mostyn. He was ridden by Horatio Powell.

Third: Peter Simple, who was third for the second consecutive year and was carrying the colours of his rider, Robert Hunter.

Fourth: The Returned, who was also in the colours of his rider William J Hope-Johnstone

References

 http://www.greyhoundderby.com/GN1842.htm
 Accounts from various local and National newspapers from March 1842
 A-Z of the Grand National by John Cottrell and Marcus Armytage. Highdown press 
 Gallant Sport by John Pinfold 
 Various UK & Ireland census returns

Grand National
 1842
Grand National
19th century in Lancashire
March 1842  sports events